Volčja Jama is a small settlement in the Municipality of Trebnje in eastern Slovenia. It lies off the regional road leading north from Žužemberk to Zagorica pri Velikem Gabru. The area is part of the historical region of Lower Carniola. The municipality is now included in the Southeast Slovenia Statistical Region.

References

External links
Volčja Jama at Geopedia

Populated places in the Municipality of Trebnje